Teach fish how to swim is an idiomatic expression derived from the Latin proverb . The phrase describes the self-sufficiency of those who know better how to do everything than the experts. It corresponds to the expression, "teaching grandmother to suck eggs". Erasmus attributed the origins of the phrase in his Adagia to Diogenianus.

A corollary idiomatic phrase is part of common usage in Chinese ""

References

English phrases